The Statue of Hans Egede is a prominent monument in Nuuk, Greenland. It commemorates the Dano-Norwegian Lutheran missionary Hans Egede who founded Nuuk in 1728. The statue lies on a hill near the shore above Nuuk Cathedral in the historical Old Nuuk area of the city. A duplicate statue by August Saabye stands outside Frederik's Church (Marmorkirken) in Copenhagen.

Gallery

References

Buildings and structures in Nuuk
Monuments and memorials in Greenland